Miercurea Ciuc  is the county seat of Harghita County, Romania. It lies in the Székely Land, a mainly Hungarian-speaking ethno-cultural region in eastern Transylvania, and is situated in the Olt River valley.

The city administers three villages:
 Ciba / Csiba
 Harghita-Băi / Hargita-fürdő
 Jigodin-Băi / Zsögöd-fürdő, including Jigodin / Csíkzsögöd

Demographics
According to the census of 2011, there were 37,980 people living in the city. Of this population, 81.39% are ethnic Hungarians, while 17.4% are ethnic Romanians, 0.9% are ethnic Romani, and 0.33% declare other nationalities.

According to the census of 2002, there were 42,029 people living in the city. Of this population, 81.75% are ethnic Hungarians, while 17.3% are ethnic Romanians, 0.62% are ethnic Romani and 0.33% declare other nationalities.

Demographic movements according to census data:

Roman Catholicism is the majority religion of Miercurea Ciuc, its adherents numbering 74.06% of the total population. Romanian Orthodox (14.99%), Hungarian Reformed (7.41%), and Unitarian (2.05%) adherents represent the most significant other religious groups.

History 
The remains of three Dacian fortifications were found in the Jigodin neighbourhood of Miercurea Ciuc; they belong to the Dacian culture of the 1st century. In the Middle Ages it was the capital of Csíkszék (Csik seat). Between 1876 and 1918, Csíkszereda was the seat of Csík County of the historical Szeklerland in the Kingdom of Hungary. After the Treaty of Trianon in 1920, it became part of Kingdom of Romania, and was seat of the Ciuc County between 1927 and 1938.

Miercurea Ciuc became part of Hungary again between 1940 and 1944 as a result of the Second Vienna Award. In 1944, the Soviet Red Army captured the town. It was returned to Romania in 1945, a move confirmed by the Paris Peace Treaties of 1947. Between 1952 and 1960, the town was part of the Magyar Autonomous Region, later named the Mureș-Magyar Autonomous Region between 1960 and 1968. In 1968, Miercurea Ciuc became the county seat of Harghita County.

In the post-World War II period, the town was industrialized; among other projects, a tractor factory, a textile factory and, in the 1960s, a beer factory were built here. The factory is now owned by Heineken. The Ciuc Beer products have gained an increasing popularity in Romania.

Climate
Miercurea Ciuc has a cool continental climate (Köppen climate classification: Dfb - without a dry season, although summer is wetter than winter and with a cold summer).
January has the lowest average temperature of the year: .

Miercurea Ciuc is one of the coldest cities in Romania, with temperatures plummeting towards  much more often than anywhere in the country, sometimes as early as November. Snow falls as early as October and as late as April.

Education 

In 2001 the Sapientia Transylvanian Hungarian University opened in the building of the former Harghita Hotel. The privately run institution is the first Hungarian university in modern Romania. Other cities in Transylvania also have Sapientia University faculties. Since the university opened, it has been attracting growing numbers of young people and intellectuals.

The Early Music Festival takes place every year in July, from 1980 onwards, mainly in the court of the castle. From 2008 it joins a Summer Music University for early music. Its concerts, held by the most important ensembles for early music in Romania and by the most famous ensembles of Europe, are with free admission.

Sports

Miercurea Ciuc is one of the coldest cities in Romania, with winter temperatures often going under , making the city ideal for winter sports. The Vákár Lajos Ice Hall annually hosts the national ice hockey championships, often won by the best-supported local team, HSC Csíkszereda. In 2006 the ice rink hosted the world junior championship in short track speed skating. The only long track speed skating oval in Romania is situated just outside the ice hockey rink.

Main sights
Petőfi Street is the main pedestrian street in the city. It houses numerous restaurants and cafés. Their Székely specialties conjure up images of a small city in Western Europe. During the summer, the street is a popular destination for afternoon and evening recreational activities.

Miercurea-Ciuc is home to the Baroque church at Șumuleu Ciuc and, in the city center, the Mikó Castle, built in a late Renaissance style. The original more decorative castle was raised in the 17th century on the orders of Ferenc Mikó Hídvégi, the personal advisor of Gabriel Bethlen, then prince of Transylvania. Much of the castle was destroyed in 1661 during the Tatar raids, but it was rebuilt at the beginning of the 18th century and was mainly used as a barracks; today it houses the Csík Székely Museum. Behind the castle is a small Skanzen (museum village), consisting of a few traditional Csíki houses and wooden gates. Across the road from the castle is the city hall built in 1886, originally the county hall of the old Hungarian Csík County. Beside the castle is the 1904 Courthouse. The latest significant addition to the architectural landscape is the controversial 2001 Millennium Church, designed by Hungarian architect Imre Makovecz and located next to the Baroque Church of the Holy Cross. There is a large Romanian Orthodox church (1929-1939) in the city center. The Orthodox Church has Neo-Byzantine characteristics. It was built in the former administrative center of Miercurea Ciuc, the Castle Square.

Șumuleu/Csíksomlyó Pentecost Pilgrimage 

A few kilometres to the east of the city centre is the Franciscan monastery of Șumuleu Ciuc, known in Hungarian as Csíksomlyó. A wooden-sculpture figure of the Virgin Mary, known as the Weeping Mary, can be found in the monastery church, which is the destination of a traditional pilgrimage of Roman Catholic Székely held since 1567, called the "Csíksomlyó Pilgrimage" (Romanian: Pelerinajul de la Sumuleu; Hungarian: Csíksomlyói Búcsú). The event,  held on the Saturday before Pentecost, attracts several hundred thousand people every year. The mass for the pilgrims is held on a meadow near the church. This traditional gathering is not only attended by Székely and Csángó Hungarians living in the region, but also by a great number of mostly Hungarian Catholics from other parts of Transylvania region, Hungary and all over the world. Beside its religious importance, the pilgrimage has also become a demonstration of the awareness and solidarity of Catholic Hungarian people living in and outside the historical region of Transylvania.

Politics 

Miercurea Ciuc is a municipality with a mayor–council form of government. The mayor and council members are elected to four-year terms. The present mayor is Attila Korodi from the Democratic Alliance of Hungarians in Romania (UDMR/RMDSZ). He was elected in September 2020 with over 73% of the vote. The local council has 19 members with the UDMR holding the majority of the seats:

Diplomatic missions
 Consulate of Hungary

Twin towns — sister cities

Miercurea Ciuc is twinned with:

References

External links 

  
 https://web.archive.org/web/20160814203034/http://regizene.ro/html/2016/en/

 
Populated places in Harghita County
Cities in Romania
Capitals of Romanian counties
Székely communities
Localities in Transylvania